Nordic people may refer to:

Peoples inhabiting the Nordic countries
North Germanic peoples or Scandinavians, a group of related ethnic groups originating in the Nordic countries
Nordic race, a historical race concept largely covering populations of Northern Europe